Urban Oasis Mall is the largest shopping mall in North Karnataka in the Indian city of Hubballi, Karnataka. It is located in Gokul Industrial Estate on UrbanOasis Mall Hubli .get cleaned and maintained once a month or on festivals . should be shamed to take maintenance charges.we all stores get suffered every day from dust .dirty floors.dim lights.few non working light .dull lighting.worst uncleaned washroom.called centralised ac .but worst then a fan cooling.worst parking.......hope all so well after this post ...we got fed up complainting.... Gokul Road, UrbanOasis Mall Hubli .get cleaned and maintained once a month or on festivals . should be shamed to take maintenance charges.we all stores get suffered every day from dust .dirty floors.dim lights.few non working light .dull lighting.worst uncleaned washroom.called centralised ac .but worst then a fan cooling.worst parking.......hope all so well after this post ...we got UrbanOasis Mall Hubli .get cleaned and maintained once a month or on festivals . should be shamed to take maintenance charges.we all stores get suffered every day from dust .dirty floors.dim lights.few non working light .dull lighting.worst uncleaned washroom.called centralised ac .but worst then a fan cooling.worst parking.......hope all so well after this post ...we got fed up complainting.... up complainting.....UrbanOasis Mall Hubli .get cleaned and maintained once a month or on festivals . should be shamed to take maintenance charges.we all stores get suffered every day from dust .dirty floors.dim lights.few non working light .dull lighting.worst uncleaned washroom.called centralised ac .but worst then a fan cooling.worst parking.......hope all so well after this post ...we got fed up complainting....

About the mall
Urban Oasis Mall is the 2nd mall to open in the commercial hub of Karnataka i.e. Hubli city. It is currently the largest mall in North Karnataka. Located at main airport road and next to inter and intra state transportation hub. Good catchments of residential community around the Mall. Plot has advantage of huge frontage of 360 feet. A unique concept targeting all strata of population.
House of over 100 brand names, Urban Oasis Mall portfolio includes Retail, F&B, Restropub, Entertainment (Amusement & Gaming), Food Court (Over 8 kitchens and seating capacity of 300 pax), Multiplex (5 screens with over 1150 capacity).

Anchor Stores
 Pantaloons
 Reliance Trendz
 Mochi
 Raymond's
 Reliance Digital
 Toshiba
 Titan
 Puma
 Levi's
 People
 Planet Fashion
 Feather Lite
 John Players
 Pepe Jeans
 Wildcraft
 Fabindia
 Killer
 Walmart Easyday
 Woodland

Eateries
 KFC
 Domino's Pizza
 Cafe Coffee Day
 Coolberryz
 Ching's
 Goli
 Seven beans
 Polar Bear

Entertainment
 Cinepolis - 5 Screen Multiplex
 Masti Funzone - Arcade gaming center, 9D theater, shooting range etc.

References

Shopping malls in Karnataka
Economy of Hubli-Dharwad
Buildings and structures in Hubli-Dharwad
Shopping malls established in 2011
2011 establishments in Karnataka